The Bathtub is a German-Austrian short film directed by Tim Ellrich. The film released on 8 January 2016 in Germany and screened in France at the Clermont-Ferrand International Short Film Festival, where it won the Special Jury Award in the International Competition.

Reception 
The Desert Sun gave the short a score of eight out of ten, as they felt that it was "an example of a clever idea perfectly realized within the confines of a short film."

Awards 
 Special Jury Awart at the 38th Clermont-Ferrand International Short Film Festival (won)
 Best International Short Film at the Dublin International Film Festival (2016, won)
 Teen View Jury Award at the Nantucket Film Festival (2016, won)

References

External links 
 The Bathtub at Kurzfilmagentur Hamburg
 

2016 films
Austrian short films
German short films
2016 short films
2010s German-language films